Willmathsville is an unincorporated community in Adair County, in the U.S. state of Missouri.

History
Willmathsville was laid out in 1856, and named after the local Wilmoth family. A post office called Willmathsville was established in 1855, and remained in operation until 1951.

References

Unincorporated communities in Adair County, Missouri
Unincorporated communities in Missouri